The 1975 season in Swedish football, starting April 1975 and ending November 1975:

Honours

Official titles

Notes

References 
Online

 
Seasons in Swedish football